The 1925 NYU Violets football team was an American football team that represented New York University as an independent during the 1925 college football season. In its first season under head coach Chick Meehan, the team compiled a 6–2–1 record.

Fullback Frank Briante starred on offense, scored 60 points, and was selected at the end of the season to be captain of the 1926 team. He later played two years in the National Football League.

Schedule

References

NYU
NYU Violets football seasons
NYU Violets football